Yu-ri, also spelled Yoo-ri or You-ri, is a Korean given name, in modern times used as a feminine name. The meaning differs based on the hanja used to write each syllable of the name. There are 62 hanja with the reading "yu" and 26 hanja with the reading "ri" on the South Korean government's official list of hanja which may be used in given names.

Korean people with this name include:
Yuri of Goguryeo (died 18 AD), second ruler of Goguryeo
Yuri of Silla (died 57 AD), third ruler of Silla
Yuri (Korean singer) (born 1976), stage name of Cha Hyun-ok, South Korean singer
Sung Yu-ri (born 1981), South Korean actress and singer
Lee Yoo-ri (born 1982), South Korean actress and businesswoman
Jung Yu-ri (born 1984), South Korean singer 
Kim Yoo-ri (born 1984), South Korean actress
Seo Yu-ri (born 1985), South Korean voice actress
Kim You-ri (born 1987), South Korean female track cyclist
Kim Yu-ri (1989–2011), South Korean model
Kwon You-ri (born 1989), South Korean swimmer
Kwon Yuri (born 1989), South Korean singer and actress, member of Girls' Generation
Jong Yu-ri (born 1992), North Korean footballer
Choe Yu-ri (born 1994), South Korean footballer
Lee Yu-ri (field hockey) (born 1994), South Korean field hockey player
Jo Yu-ri (born 2001), South Korean singer, former member of Iz*One

Fictional characters with this name include
Han Yoo-ri, in 2003 South Korean television series Stairway to Heaven
Lee Yu-ri, in 2009 South Korean sitcom High Kick Through the Roof
Cha Yu-ri, in 2020 South Korean television series Hi Bye, Mama!
Park Yu-ri, in 2020 South Korean Netflix adaptation Sweet Home (TV series)
Ki Yu-ri, in 2020 South Korean television series Tale of the Nine Tailed

See also
List of Korean given names

References

Korean feminine given names